Daniel Elahi Galán was the defending champion but chose not to defend his title.

Hugo Dellien won the title after defeating Camilo Ugo Carabelli 6–3, 7–5 in the final.

Seeds

Draw

Finals

Top half

Bottom half

References

External links
Main draw
Qualifying draw

Lima Challenger - 1
2021 Singles